The Serbian Ambassador in Washington, D.C. is the official representative of the Government of in Belgrade to the Government of the United States.

List of representatives

See also
Serbia–United States relations

References 

Chief of Protocol, Diplomatic Representation for Serbia (Formerly YUGOSLAVIA, SERBIA AND MONTENEGRO, PEOPLE'S REPUBLIC OF SERBIA, SOCIALIST REPUBLIC OF SERBIA)

 
United States
Serbia